John Karlen (born John Adam Karlewicz; May 28, 1933 – January 22, 2020) was an American character actor who played multiple roles on the ABC serial Dark Shadows on and off from 1967 to 1971.

In 1971, Karlen starred as the male lead in Daughters of Darkness. He played Harvey Lacey, husband of Mary Beth Lacey (played by Tyne Daly), on the CBS crime series Cagney & Lacey (1982–88). Karlen reprised the role of "Willie Loomis" for a series of Dark Shadows audio dramas produced by Big Finish Productions.

Life and career
Karlen was born May 28, 1933, in Brooklyn, the son of Helen Agnes (née Balondowicz) and Adam Marion Karlewicz. He was of Polish descent. He enrolled in the American Academy of Dramatic Arts on a scholarship. His first acting experiences were on early television productions such as From These Roots and Kraft Television Theatre. His stage career began in 1959 in Sweet Bird of Youth.

He accumulated roles on both stage and television before winning one of his signature roles in 1967 in the daytime serial Dark Shadows. It was Karlen's pivotal character of Willie Loomis who released vampire Barnabas Collins from his coffin, setting off the events of the series.  Karlen would stay with the television series for 182 episodes, playing various characters through 1971. In addition to Willie, he played Carl Collins, a parallel-universe William H. Loomis, Desmond Collins and Kendrick Young. In the 1971 film Night of Dark Shadows, he played Alex Jenkins along with other cast members from the Dark Shadows TV show.

While not appearing on Dark Shadows in the late sixties, he appeared on Love Is a Many Splendored Thing as Jock Porter and Hidden Faces as Sharkey Primrose. He reunited with his Dark Shadows co-stars for the 1970 House of Dark Shadows as Willie Loomis, and, in 1971, with Night of Dark Shadows  as Alex Jenkins.

Karlen moved to a series of guest appearances on television productions, establishing himself in 1982 as Harvey Lacey, husband of Tyne Daly's character Mary Beth Lacey on Cagney & Lacey . He appeared in 110 episodes over six years. Karlen won an Emmy Award for his portrayal of Harvey Lacey in 1986; he received 2 further nominations, in 1985 and 1987.

His career included numerous movie roles, during which he reprised the "Harvey Lacey" character in four Cagney and Lacey television movies: Cagney & Lacey: The Return in 1994, Cagney & Lacey: Together Again and Cagney & Lacey: The View Through the Glass Ceiling in 1995, and Cagney & Lacey: True Convictions in 1996.

Personal life and death
In 1963, Karlen married acting teacher Betty Karlen but divorced in 1998; they had one child, Adam (born 1966).

Karlen died from heart failure in Burbank, California on January 22, 2020, at age 86.

Theatre

Filmography

References

External links

1933 births
20th-century American male actors
21st-century American male actors
American Academy of Dramatic Arts alumni
American male film actors
American male stage actors
American male television actors
American people of Polish descent
2020 deaths
Male actors from New York City
Outstanding Performance by a Supporting Actor in a Drama Series Primetime Emmy Award winners
People from Brooklyn